Cry Blood, Apache is a 1970 western film directed by Jack Starrett and assistant director Robert Tessier. The film released by Liberty Entertainment was from an original story by Harold Roberts with a screenplay by Sean MacGregor.

The film runs one hour, 22 minutes. Its distribution was by Golden Eagle International and Goldstone Film Enterprises. The film has been rereleased as part of a 20 movie DVD pack titled Mean Guns by Mill Creek Entertainment.

Cast 
Joel McCrea as older Pitcalin
Jody McCrea as Pitcalin
Maria Gahua as Jenne
Dan Kemp as Vittorio
Don Henley as Benjie
Rik Nervik as Billy
Robert Tessier as Two Card Charlie
Jack Starrett as The Deacon
Carolyn Stellar as Cochalla

See also
 List of American films of 1970

External links
 
    

1970 films
1970 Western (genre) films
Films directed by Jack Starrett
American Western (genre) films
1970s American films